The plain-tailed wren (Pheugopedius euophrys) is a species of songbird in the family Troglodytidae. It has a mostly rufous body with a gray, black, and white striped head. It is found in the Andes of southern Colombia, Ecuador, and northern Peru. Its natural habitat is subtropical or tropical moist montane forests.  Plain-tailed wrens are so-called bamboo specialists and live almost exclusively in chusquea bamboo thickets. Like other wrens, its diet consists mainly of insects with some seeds and berries.

Taxonomy 
The plain-tailed wren belongs to the order Passeriformes and the family Troglodytidae.  Although there are subtle differences in appearance between birds from the east and west slopes of the Andes, the two are not considered separate subspecies.

Description

Physical 
The plain-tailed wren measures between 16 and 16.5 cm. The back, wings, and tail are rufous, with an olive cast on the back. The belly and other underparts are buffy-gray, and the head is gray with black and white stripes (superciliary, malar, and submalar stripes).  The bill is gray and slightly decurved.  The plain-tailed is large for a wren, but shows the characteristic short tail shared by the family.  As the name suggests, it is unique among wrens because its tail lacks any barring.

Plain-tailed wrens on the western slope of the Andes tend to have heavy black spotting on the breast, while eastern-slope birds show no such markings.

Vocalizations 
The plain-tailed wren sings a rolling, repetitive song. Males and females and even groups of wrens are known to join in duets. Two-part choruses usually take an ABCD form, where the male contributes the A and C phrases and the female sings during B and D.  Group choruses are thought to be used in mutual territory defense to intimidate intruding individuals.
Singing pairs of plain-tailed wrens take co-operation a stage further than human couples who finish off each other's sentences, research has shown. Males and females perform intimate duets in which they alternate 
syllables so quickly it sounds as if a single bird is singing.
Scientists led by Dr Eric Fortune and Dr Melissa Coleman (Claremont College, Claremont CA, US) discovered that the brains of both birds process the entire duet, not just each bird's own contribution. 
The research, reported in the journal Science, involved recording duets sung by wrens in the bamboo forests of Ecuador's Antisana volcano.

Distribution and habitat
The plain-tailed wren prefers chusquea bamboo thickets in tropical moist montane forests.  It also frequents recently disturbed areas such as fresh landslides, presumably because of the increase in insect activity.  It is most commonly found at elevations between 2200 and 3200 metres.  It is found mainly in Ecuador, but its range extends into southern Colombia and northern Peru.
The plain-tailed wren is listed as a species of least concern. It is common within its range.

Behavior

Diet
The plain-tailed wren is mainly insectivorous, like most other wrens. Its diet can include seeds and berries, but these are not its primary food source.  The bird is most often observed foraging on or near the ground in chusquea bamboo undergrowth, in search of invertebrates.

Breeding
Plain-tailed wrens are thought to use song duetting as a form of bonding and/or mate guarding.  No other information regarding mating systems or nesting behavior was found.

References

 BirdLife International 2004.  Thryothorus euophrys.   2006 IUCN Red List of Threatened Species.   Downloaded on 27 July 2007.
Johnson, Tom. 2010. Plain-tailed Wren (Pheugopedius euophrys), Neotropical Birds Online (T. S. Schulenberg, Editor). Ithaca: Cornell Lab of Ornithology; retrieved from Neotropical Birds Online: http://neotropical.birds.cornell.edu/portal/species/overview?p_p_spp=532716

Ridgely, Robert S. & Greenfield, Paul J. (2001): The Birds of Ecuador: Field Guide. Cornell University Press, Ithaca, New York.

External links
song audio: https://macaulaylibrary.org/asset/83163

plain-tailed wren
Birds of the Ecuadorian Andes
plain-tailed wren
plain-tailed wren
Taxonomy articles created by Polbot